The Grimsby-class sloops were a class of 13 sloops-of-war laid down between 1933 and 1940. Of these, eight were built in the United Kingdom for the Royal Navy, four in Australia for the Royal Australian Navy and one for the Royal Indian Navy. Main armament was initially two  guns for RN ships and three  for Australian ships, but armament varied considerably between ships, and was increased later.

Some survivors of this class served into the 1960s. One ship, is preserved as the headquarters of the Honourable Company of Master Mariners.

Design
All of these ships were designed to combine the convoy-escort role of the  Flower class with the minesweeping duties of the Hunt class, being fitted with equipment for both roles. By 1932, however, it became clear that what was needed was ships dedicated to a single role. Development therefore began of the s as a cheaper mass-production minesweeper, while a new class of sloops would be built that was more closely matched to the escort role.

The new class of escort sloops, the Grimsby class, had a heavier gun armament than its predecessors, with two 4.7-inch (120 mm) Mark IX guns mounted fore and aft replacing the  guns of the earlier ships. As the 4.7-inch guns were low-angle guns, not suited to anti aircraft use, a single QF 3-inch 20 cwt anti-aircraft gun was mounted in "B" position. Four 3-pounder saluting guns completed the ships' gun armament. The ship was powered by two geared steam turbines driving two shafts, fed by two Admiralty 3-drum boilers.

Eight ships of the class were built for the Royal Navy, being laid down between 1933 and 1935 and completing between 1934 and 1936. The last two ships built for the Royal Navy,  and  had differing armaments, with Aberdeen replacing the 4.7 and 3-inch guns with two 4-inch anti-aircraft guns, and adding a quadruple .50-inch anti-aircraft machine gun mount, while Fleetwood had a main gun armament of two twin 4-inch anti-aircraft mounts, with a short-range anti-aircraft armament of four .50 in machine guns.

The Royal Australian Navy also adopted the Grimsby class, with two ships being laid down in 1934–35 and completed in 1935–36, with two more ships laid down in 1938–39 and completed in 1940. The first two ships were armed with three single 4-inch anti-aircraft guns, while the third and fourth ships having one twin and one-single 4-inch mount, with short-range armament a quadruple machine gun mount in all four ships.

The armament of most of the class was reinforced during the Second World War, with several gaining additional 4-inch guns, with the close in anti aircraft armament being supplemented by the addition of Oerlikon 20 mm cannon. The ships' depth charge complement increased from 15 at the start of the war to 40 for Australian ships and up to 90 for Royal Navy ships, while several ships were also refitted with a Hedgehog anti-submarine projector.

Ships

See also

List of corvette and sloop classes of the Royal Navy
List of Royal Australian Navy ships

Notes

References

External links
 HQS Wellington, home of the Honourable Company of Master Mariners

 
Military history of Grimsby
Ship classes of the Royal Navy
Sloop classes